The MCW Metrocab is a taxicab that was manufactured between 1987 and 2000 and as the Metrocab TTT from 2000 to 2006. It was designed and originally produced by the British vehicle manufacturing company Metro Cammell Weymann (MCW), with ownership passing to Reliant in 1989, Hooper in 1991 and finally Kamkorp in 2000.

History

Weymann's Ltd and then Metro-Cammell-Weymann had built the Beardmore Mk 7 taxi until 1966, it was not a surprise that they sought to replace it with their own design, rather more that it took them so long to get a replacement into production.

The basic design of the vehicle dated back at least as far as 1970 when a prototype was caught in Westminster undergoing London trials. The overall profile of the vehicle closely matched that of the Metrocab as launched 17 years later, although the original front grill, taken from a 1970 Ford Cortina Mk II, was superseded by a more contemporary design by the time the vehicle entered production using headlamps and grille from the Ford Granada Mk 2. The taillight units came from the Escort Cabriolet, while the dash moulding is from the Austin Rover Maestro/Montego. It was presented in early 1987 and featured a particularly low floor to make entry and egress simpler.

The taxicab manufacturing business was sold by MCW to Reliant in 1989 and the vehicle remained in production with Metrocab, the new company. In 1997 the Series II Metrocab was announced with many cosmetic changes, in particular a new grille, bumper and light design. The Metrocab featured a range of different badges, reflecting its varied ownership; originally with the MCW logo, it then featured a Reliant badge, before the full Metrocab name was displayed on the leading edge of the bonnet in a similar style to Land Rover as part of the Series II facelift.

Prince Philip sometimes used a LPG equipped Metrocab around London.

Vehicle features
The vehicle had a Ford Transit 2.5 litre direct-injected diesel engine and incorporated many notable features for a taxi. The chassis is from galvanized steel and the bodywork was constructed from fibreglass. It was the first Hackney carriage model to have disc brakes as standard (from 1992), it also had a seven-passenger seat option, and wheelchair access.

Many of the parts came from other car builders including headlights and front indicators from the Ford Granada Mk 2 (which had been out of production for two years by 1987), rear lights from the Escort Mk 4 Cabriolet and various switches and controls from the Austin Maestro/Montego range were used. Due to the fibreglass construction and virtually bulletproof engine, many of these vehicles are still in daily use over 20 years later. Spare parts and workshop advice is available from a small number of specialist repairers.

Metrocab TTT

In March 2000 a revised Metrocab was launched as the Metrocab TTT. The TTT was advertised to contain 700 improvements over the original Metrocab including new front design, new engine and the end of the fibreglass construction. Shortly after the launch of the new model, ownership of the Metrocab company passing from Reliant to Hooper and then on to Kamkorp. Production ceased in 2004 when the company went into administration, and was restarted in 2005 at a rate of one vehicle per week, but all production eventually ceased for good in April 2006.

Vehicle features
The TTT featured a Toyota 2L-T turbodiesel engine.

See also
 Ecotive Metrocab

References

Taxis of the United Kingdom
Taxis of London
Taxi vehicles